The Tguma is a mountain of the Swiss Lepontine Alps, situated west of Thusis in the canton of Graubünden. It lies on the range between the Safiental and the Domleschg.

References

External links

 Tguma on Hikr

Mountains of the Alps
Mountains of Graubünden
Lepontine Alps
Mountains of Switzerland